Cienfuegos, capital of Cienfuegos Province, is a city on the southern coast of Cuba. Since the late 1960s, Cienfuegos has become one of Cuba's main industrial centers, especially in the energy and sugar sectors. The city is dubbed La Perla del Sur (Pearl of the South). Although Cienfuegos literally translates to "one hundred fires" (cien, "one hundred"; fuegos, "fires"), the city takes its name from the surname of José Cienfuegos, Captain General of Cuba (1816–19).

In 2005, UNESCO inscribed the Urban Historic Centre of Cienfuegos on the World Heritage List, citing Cienfuegos as the best extant example of early 19th century Spanish Enlightenment implementation in urban planning. The downtown area contains six buildings from 1819–50, 327 buildings from 1851–1900, and 1188 buildings from the 20th century. There is no other place in the Caribbean which contains such a remarkable cluster of Neoclassical structures.

History

The area where the city lies was identified as Cacicazgo de Jagua by early Spanish conquistadors. It was originally settled by Taino indigenous people. Cacicazgo translates from the Taino language as "chiefdom". Cacicazgo de Jagua was therefore the chiefdom of Chief Jagua.

The city was later settled by French immigrants from Bordeaux and Louisiana led by Don Louis de Clouet on April 22, 1819. The settlers named the city Fernandina de Jagua in honor of King Ferdinand VII of Spain and Chief Jagua. The settlement successively became a town (villa) in 1829, renamed for José Cienfuegos, Captain General of Cuba (1816–19), and a city in 1880. Many of the streets in old town reflect French origins in their names: Bouyón, D'Clouet, Hourruitiner, Gacel, and Griffo, for instance.

Cienfuegos port, despite being one of the latest settlements established during the colonial era, soon grew to be a powerful town due to the fertile fields surrounding it and its position on the trade route between Jamaica and South American cities to the southeast and the hinterland provincial capital of Santa Clara to the northeast. Its advantageous trading location on the historically eponymous Bay of Jagua was used by the Cuban sugar oligarchy when a railroad was built between both cities between 1853 and 1860.

Near Cienfuegos was the scene of a battle during the Spanish–American War on May 11, 1898, between American Marines attempting to sever underwater Spanish communication lines and the Spanish defenders.

During the Cuban Revolution, the city saw an uprising against Fulgencio Batista and was bombed in retaliation on September 5, 1957. The city later became a key industrial center, part of the revolutionary government's "anti-urban" planning policy, with industrial projects including the never-completed Juraguá nuclear power plant, the "Camilo Cienfuegos" oil refinery named for Camilo Cienfuegos, and the "Carlos Marx" cement factory.

In 1969 and 1970, a flotilla of Soviet naval vessels visited the city, which included two barges used to store and transport nuclear waste and a submarine maintenance vessel. Their presence was detected by U-2 reconnaissance aircraft of the United States Air Force that were sent out to monitor the Cuban coastline after a suspicious Soviet request to renegotiate the terms of the Kennedy–Khrushchev agreements of 1962 that were made in the aftermath of the Cuban Missile Crisis, with many American intelligence analysts concluding that the Soviet Navy was planning to construct a submarine base in Cienfuegos. This was interpreted by some to be in violation of the 1962 agreements between Kennedy and Khrushchev. However, because of a détente between the Soviet Union and the United States since 1962, no major military or diplomatic confrontation ensued, and the Soviets agreed to withdraw their ships after American Secretary of State Henry Kissinger informed Soviet ambassador to the United States Anatoly Dobrynin that the United States government believed the presence of these naval vessels to be a violation of the agreements made eight years before.

In 2005, Hurricane Dennis made its second landfall near Cienfuegos at about 1:00PM AST (17:00 UTC) with winds of 232 km/h (144 mph) and gusts reaching 285 km/h (177 mph).

Geography

Near the entrance to Cienfuegos Bay is Castillo de Jagua (full name: Castillo de Nuestra Señora de los Angeles de Jagua), a fortress erected in 1745 for protection against Caribbean pirates.

Cienfuegos, one of the chief seaports of Cuba, is a center of the sugar trade as well as coffee and tobacco. While sugarcane is the chief crop, local farmers also grow coffee.

Climate
According to the Köppen Climate Classification system, Cienfuegos has a tropical savanna climate, abbreviated "Aw" on climate maps.

Demographics
In 2004, the municipality of Cienfuegos had a population of 163,824.

Sports
Cienfuegos fields a team in the Cuban National Series, the Cienfuegos Elefantes. Since joining the league in 1977–78, the best finish the Camaroneros have achieved is a 3rd place showing in the 2010–11 Cuban National Series. Despite finishing with the best record at 59–31, the Elefantes lost the semifinals in six games to the eventual champions, the Pinar del Río Vegueros.

Attractions

Castillo de Nuestra Señora de los Ángeles de Jagua – fortress
Arco de Triunfo – the only Arco de Triunfo in Cuba
Catedral de Nuestra Señora de la Purísima Concepción – cathedral with stained glass work, built 1833–1869
Delfinario – dolphins and sea lions in a saltwater lagoon
Jardín Botánico de Cienfuegos – 97 hectares of botanic garden
Museo Provincial – furniture and porcelain museum
Palacio de Valle – built 1913–1917 in neo-gothic style
Palmira Yorubá Pantheon – museum of religious afro-catholic syncretism
Parque José Martí – park in Plaza de Armas
Teatro Tomás Terry – colonial style theater 
Palacio Ferrer
Malecón de Cienfuegos
Paseo del Prado – longest street in Cuba, full of colorful buildings
Quintero (cigar) cigar factory
University of Cienfuegos "Carlos Rafael Rodríguez" (UCF) – the province's high education institution
Rancho Luna Beach
Nicho
Laguna del Cura - an authentic fishing boat lagoon.

Transportation
The city is served by Jaime González Airport, which, as of 2021, partly because of the Covid-19 outbreak, had no scheduled airline flights.

Notable people
 José Abreu, MLB player for the Chicago White Sox
 María Conchita Alonso, Cuban-Venezuelan-American singer; born here
 Yordany Álvarez, MLS player for Real Salt Lake
 Joe Azcue, MLB player for the Cincinnati Reds, Kansas City Royals, Cleveland Indians, Boston Red Sox, California Angels, and Milwaukee Brewers
 Luis Posada Carriles, Cuban anti-Castro activist believed to be responsible for the Cubana Flight 455 bombing; born here
 Yoán Moncada, MLB player for the Chicago White Sox
 Benny Moré, Cuban singer
 Olance Nogueras Rofes, Cuban journalist
 Gina Pellón, Cuban painter; lives in exile in Paris
 Yasiel Puig, MLB player for the Cleveland Indians; born here
 Robeisy Ramirez, professional boxer and two-time Olympic Gold medalist
 Osmel Sousa, Cuban-Venezuelan entrepreneur and former president of the Miss Venezuela Organization.
 José Tartabull, MLB player for the Boston Red Sox
 Cristóbal Torriente, Cuban-born Hall of Fame baseball player

Sister cities 
Cienfuegos has the following sister cities:
  Tacoma, Washington, United States
  Etzatlán, Mexico
  Cambridge, Massachusetts, United States
  Kingston, Ontario, Canada (2005)
  Bahía Blanca, Argentina
  Saint-Nazaire, France
  Contagem, Brazil

Gallery

See also
 Historic Centre of Cienfuegos
 List of cities in Cuba

References

Bibliography

External links

 
 Cienfuegos City Council
 Guide of Cienfuegos
 Photo collections with most of the city's landmarks on Flickr

 
Cities in Cuba
Populated places in Cienfuegos Province
Port cities and towns in Cuba
World Heritage Sites in Cuba
Populated places established in 1819
1819 establishments in New Spain
1810s establishments in the Spanish West Indies